Association Sportive Beauvais Oise (commonly referred to as AS Beauvais, ASBO, or simply Beauvais) is a French association football club based in Beauvais. The club was formed in 1945 as a result of a merger and currently play in the Championnat National 2, the fourth level of French football. Beauvais plays its home matches at the Stade Pierre Brisson located within the city.

History 
AS Beauvais Oise was founded in 1945 under the name AS Beauvais-Marissel as a result of a merger between local clubs Véloce Club Beauvaisien, Union Sportive de Voisinlieu and GS Marissel. The club began its history as an amateur club, but achieved professional status in 1986, changing its name to the simpler AS Beauvais. From 1986–2003, Beauvais played mostly in the second division of French football.

In 1989 the name of the club was changed to AS Beauvais Oise.

In 2004 the club was relegated from the Championnat National and gave up its professional status.

Players

Current squad

Notable former players 
For a list of former Beauvais players, see :Category:AS Beauvais Oise players.

Honours 
Championnat National
Champions (1): 2000
Championnat de France Amateur
Champions (1): 2006
Division d'Honneur (Picardie)
Champions (6): 1968, 1970, 1974
Division d'Honneur (Nord-Est)
Champions (3): 1956, 1960, 1966
Coupe de Picardie
Champions (1): 2008
Coupe de l'Oise
Champions (15): 1955, 1959, 1965, 1966, 1972, 1973, 1974, 1976, 1977, 1982, 1983, 1984, 1987, 1992, 1993

References

External links 

 Official Website 

 
Association football clubs established in 1945
1945 establishments in France
Sport in Beauvais
Beauvais
Beauvais